Fred Earl Washington (July 11, 1967 – December 21, 1990) was a professional American football defensive tackle in the National Football League (NFL) for one season for the Chicago Bears.  He was killed in a car accident during his rookie season. He was a member of the 1984 Texas 4A  State Football Champion Denison YellowJackets and was voted defensive player of the year.

References

External links

1967 births
1990 deaths
People from Denison, Texas
Players of American football from Texas
American football defensive tackles
TCU Horned Frogs football players
Chicago Bears players
Road incident deaths in Illinois